is the title of a fictional series written and illustrated by Japanese author Mikiyo Tsuda about the lives of three high school boys and the school they attend. The series is contained within multiple media pieces which began as a manga first serialized in the manga magazine Wings starting in 2002. After the first manga series ended, a sequel entitled Princess Princess + started serialization in the same magazine in May 2006, and finished in January 2007. An anime has since been adapted from the manga and began airing in Japan on April 5, 2006, produced by the Japanese animation studio, Studio Deen. A live action adaptation called Princess Princess D aired in Japan from June 28, 2006 to September 13, 2006. Finally, a visual novel video game for the PlayStation 2 based on the series was released on October 26, 2006 in Japan.

Plot
Princess Princess is a story revolving around the lives of three boys chosen to dress up as girls at the all-boy school they attend, which also just happens to be the most elite school in the area. The main protagonist, Toru Kouno, has just transferred to a new all-boys school, Fujimori, after living with his uncle for a time. Students (based on certain qualifications) are selected to be Princesses and are made to dress up as girls and attend school functions like this.

At the beginning of the story, there are already two such Princesses, Yuujirou Shihodani and Mikoto Yutaka, known as the Western Princess and Eastern Princess respectively, due to their room location. Toru is convinced into becoming a Princess soon after entering the school though once he accepted the job, he found it to be much more enjoyable than he thought.

Princess system
A candidate for a Princess must be a first year student of the school since they: have more free time from school work, their bodies have not fully developed, and they can easily wear girls' outfits. From all the first years, those with the best looks and most-suited personalities are chosen to be Princesses. However, if one only has good looks but is not popular, that person will not be chosen. The Princesses' duties consist of: wearing girl's clothes to morning meetings or school events, encouraging others at school, and cheering at school events. Students who are required to be Princesses cannot refuse the position.

When there is a conflict between a Princess' work and school classes, absence from class or leaving early can be considered as a school vacation, and the absence will not show up on his attendance record. Every month the Princesses receive thirty school luncheon vouchers each. Therefore, when they eat at school, they do not have to pay. All necessary school supplies (notebooks, school apparel, etc.) are covered by the Princess budget, which is the largest in the whole school. Also, the Princesses will receive partial profit they can use as pocket money from the photography club that takes pictures of the Princesses and sells them to other students. The school rules require the photography club to share profits with whoever serves as model for the photos they sell, and the photographs of the Princesses are the most sought-after.

Characters

Princess Princess

Princesses

, Takeru Satoh (Live action actor)
He is the primary protagonist of the story who transfers to an all-boys school and becomes one of the Princesses. He seems enthusiastic about it since all the Princesses get a lot of free stuff and added luxuries. His parents died in an accident, which is when his uncle and aunt adopted him. He seems to be very reluctant about spending time with his family, which mainly has to do with his younger step-sister Sayaka, who has an unhealthy obsession with him. He mainly uses his job as a Princess as a distraction from the problems he has with his family and in effect usually gets very into acting like a Princess, much like Yuujirou. He often teams up with Yuujirou to tease Mikoto, much to Mikoto's chagrin. Yuujirou often jokingly says he and Toru are lovers—in fact when Toru's stepsister, Sayaka, comes looking for Toru, Yuujirou kisses him to scare her away; Toru was not amused by this. He reveals to Yuujirou on a day off of school that his ideal girl is the comforting type, which leads to the latter comically asking if Akira fit that type. When Toru answers yes, he seems get flustered when he realizes the actual question.

, Ray Fujita (Live action actor)
The Eastern Princess, he is a confident boy and doesn't have many problems with dressing up like a girl in front of other people. He constantly likes to tease Mikoto because he thinks it's fun how Mikoto reacts. He has distanced himself from the rest of his family because he thinks that his mother, step-father, and younger half-brother together are the "perfect family". As the series progress, Yuujirou become quite close to Toru. Toru is the first person he ever opened up to. He and Toru often team up against Mikoto when Mikoto is at odds with them concerning Princess duties. This gets Mikoto to end up agreeing with them, especially since they hold leverage over Mikoto who doesn't want his girlfriend to find out about him being a Princess. Apparently, Yuujirou's idea of a girl for him is one with a perfect figure.

, Kenta Kamakari (Live action actor)
The Western Princess, he is more reluctant than the other two Princesses to cross-dress because he does not want his girlfriend Megumi to find out about it. As such he is nonetheless a reliable character—he often stubbornly whines and complains about things the Princesses have to do but always ends up doing them anyway whether he's forced to or not. He is very self-conscious about being a Princess and is mortified whenever someone else outside of school finds out about it. He is the most animated of the three Princesses, always showing a lot of emotion and expression when yelling at Toru and Yuujirou. Mikoto is also tone deaf, having never sung before becoming a princess.

He also cares a lot about the people close to him, though especially for his girlfriend. He has shown to change character and act different when around Megumi, which greatly amuses Toru and Yuujirou. Despite all the whining and complaining, however, he eventually becomes accustomed to his duty as a Princess such that he once had a brief fantasy of him and Megumi both dressed in Gothic Lolita Princess costumes. Princess Princess is not the first media series Mikoto has appeared in. Mikoto's first appearance was as a supporting character from one of Tsuda's earlier manga works, The Day of Revolution, which was about Mikoto's girlfriend, Megumi.

Student council

, Takumi Saito (Live action actor)
The student council president, he is a very confident person who was also a former Princess one year prior to the beginning of the story, his first year. He is a very good leader and often comes up with fool-proof plans which benefit him and the rest of the student council. He can also be very intimidating to talk with and in effect people often go along with his plans regardless.

, Shōta Minami (Live action actor)
The student council vice president who is very strong.

, Haruhiko Satō (Live action actor)
The student council treasurer, who is very good with math and can solve equations in his head quickly.

, Hiroshi Yoshihara (Live action actor)
The student council secretary, who has the impressive ability of speed and sleight of hand.

Other characters

, Osamu Adachi (Live action actor)
The class president in Toru's class (1-D), he is a highly respected member of the school: due to his much-revered older brother and his own excellence in both academic performance and character, he is referred to as "Sakamoto-sama" by his peers regardless of their seniorities, and all students bow when they see him, though he feels somewhat intimidated by such reverence. For pretty much the same reasons, he has been hand-picked by Arisada as the next in line for the student council president and has on quite a number of occasions shown great leadership skills.

He has five immediate family members, all of whom are amazingly beautiful (and, in his sisters' case, androgynous as well). In the past, Akira had often been pointed out as the only "average" looking person in his family by both himself and strangers. For a while, Akira felt out of place or "unworthy" of belonging to his family. When his family found out about his worries, they quickly reassured him and dismissed such ideas. His siblings (especially his older brother and older sister) usually fight for his attention, since their brother is such a kind-hearted and good-natured boy. Akira and his family are the main characters of one of Tsuda's earlier manga works, Family Complex.

, Kōhei Yamamoto (Live action actor)
A third-year student majoring in home economics, he designs all of the clothes that the Princesses wear. He's fairly obsessed about this and always shows a lot of enthusiasm about it. However, he holds a lot of fashion awards for all the costumes he's designed and made himself. When it comes to the Princesses, he's easily struck by inspiration for new costumes.

 He's Akira's older brother and a former student at Fujimori who was known by all who knew him as "Sakamoto-sama" because of his amazing beauty. He comes back during the cultural festival to help the student council raise money. Harumi is usually very cool and smiles constantly. However, in the presence of his younger brother, he becomes completely emotional and is easily moved to tears (something which Toru and Yuujirou accidentally notice when visiting Akira, as seen in a manga filler chapter).

Known as Megumi-san by Mikoto due to her being older than he is, she is Mikoto's girlfriend. She has a caring heart and would do things asked of her by Mikoto so as not to upset him. Also, she is not entirely sure of Mikoto's feelings towards her and once even suspected something was going on between Mikoto and the other two Princesses. Megumi and Mikoto seem to have a very good, understanding relationship between them. For instance, even when Megumi finds out Mikoto is a Princess, she says she doesn't care and Mikoto's the same person she loves either way.

She has a very prominent effect on Mikoto's personality, being able to elevate his spirits when he's feeling depressed. Similarly, when around Mikoto she is very happy and it's obvious that they enjoy each other's company. As noted by Mikoto in episode five of the anime, Megumi does not seem to like using makeup because she thinks it's cuter. Mikoto seems to have no complaints over this as he thinks she's cute regardless. Megumi is the main character of Tsuda's earlier series, The Day of Revolution, with Makoto and Mikoto as supporting characters.

She is Mikoto's older sister and has a different personality when compared to her brother. She is very forceful and never seems to back down, especially when the scenario involves Mikoto. Ironically, while Mikoto looks more feminine in appearance, Makoto looks more masculine.

The daughter of Toru's aunt and uncle that adopted him, making her Toru's younger step-sister and cousin. She is in love with Toru and is very adamant (to the point of psychosis) about them getting married one day, against the wishes of Toru himself (as his feelings for her never evolved beyond that for a sister). She is overly obsessive with him and has hurt one of Toru's previous girlfriends by shoving her down a set of steps out of jealousy. Her fragile grip on reality was wounded by Yuujirou's claim that he and Toru are lovers- and that Toru is not interested in girls because of this. In vol. 3 of the manga, Sayaka is encountered again by Yuujirou and Toru when they are out shopping, leading to Sayaka apologising, then declaring that in her mind only Yuujirou is worthy of dating Toru and he'd better hurry up and make her "brother" his.

He is Yuujirou's younger half-brother who appears in episode nine of the anime and vol. 5 of the manga where he had come with his parents to see his brother at the school festival. He tends to be very shy and at first is especially reluctant to talk with Yuujirou. He has claimed that he wants Yuujirou home more often so he can marry "sister" (Yuujirou in his princess costume).

The director of the board who is in charge of the school. He became the director after his father retired. At first, he disapproved of the Princess system and sought to abolish it. Ryusaki only appears in the anime, and greatly resembles Mitaka in appearance and personality.

A transfer student who first appears in volume four of the manga. Upon returning from studies abroad and transferring to Fujimori, Mitaka learns of the student council elections and decides to run against Akira. At first he has a low opinion of Akira, thinking of him as dull and not a worthy opponent, which causes Yuujirou and Toru to dislike him immensely. He eventually warms up to Akira, and by the end of the manga series he is so devoted to him that he is never more than a few feet away from him.

Princess Princess +

He is one of the new Princesses chosen by Toru and others. His parents show him little attention because they are often busy and on business.

He is also one of the new Princesses chosen by Toru and others. He lost his parents, and now lives with his elder brother and younger sister.

Media

Manga
The Princess Princess manga, written and illustrated by Mikiyo Tsuda, was first serialized in the manga magazine Wings, with the first tankōbon volume being released at August 2002. The series was published by Shinshokan in five volumes. Once the first manga series ended, a sequel entitled Princess Princess + started serialization in the May 2006 issue of Wings. The first manga series has been licensed by Digital Manga Publishing, with the first volume released in November 2006. Mikiyo has commented that Wings preferred her not to write it as a shōnen-ai series.

Anime
The anime series of Princess Princess based on the manga that preceded it aired in Japan from April 5 to June 21, 2006 and had twelve episodes.

Episodes

Live action drama

A live action drama based loosely on the series, named , aired on TV Asahi from June 28, 2006 to September 13, 2006, for ten episodes. The D in the title is for drama. Mikoto is the protagonist of this series. The story deviates from the original manga in that a new character named Otoya Hanazono, who is dissatisfied with the half-hearted efforts of the current Princesses, creates his own team of Dark Princesses to rival for the students' attention. The drama also excludes Mikoto's girlfriend, Megumi, and like the anime series features shōnen-ai overtones that are less present in the original manga.

Visual novel
A visual novel based on the series named  was released on October 26, 2006 for the PlayStation 2 in Japan.

Reception

Casey Brienza described the anime as "phony" and disliked its premise of forced cross-dressing.

References

Further reading
Comics Should Be Good review of Princess Princess Plus

External links
 Princess Princess at Digital Manga Publishing
 

2002 manga
2006 Japanese television series debuts
2006 Japanese television series endings
2006 manga
2006 video games
Anime series based on manga
Comedy-drama anime and manga
Cross-dressing in anime and manga
Cross-dressing in television
Cross-dressing in video games
Digital Manga Publishing titles
Japan-exclusive video games
Marvelous Entertainment
Mikiyo Tsuda
PlayStation 2 games
PlayStation 2-only games
School life in anime and manga
Shinshokan manga
Shōjo manga
Studio Deen
LGBT in anime and manga
TV Asahi original programming
Video games developed in Japan
Visual novels